Nelly Zolanda Plúas Arias is an Ecuadorian politician and a member of Ecuador's Social Christian Party (PSC) and the National Assembly.

Life
Nelly Zolanda Plúas Arias has several university degrees and she was a professor in 2015 at the University of Guayaquil.

She became a member of the National Assembly in 2021 and her substitute is Alvarado López Edson Cristobal. She represents the Province of Guayas District 4.

She is a member of the Permanent Commission of Education, Culture, Science, Technology, Innovation and Ancestral Knowledge after she was elected in May 2020. Other members of that commission include Ana Raffo, Mariuxi Sanchez and Isabel Enriquez.

In December 2022 she was backing the assembly's resolution to create a new area of national heritage around the archeological site and river island of La Tolita.

References

Living people
Members of the National Assembly (Ecuador)
Women members of the National Assembly (Ecuador)
21st-century Ecuadorian women politicians
21st-century Ecuadorian politicians
Year of birth missing (living people)